Juraj Droba (born 25 May 1971 in Bratislava, Czechoslovakia) is a Slovak politician and businessman serving since 2017 as Governor of Bratislava region since 4 December 2017. Between 2010 and 2018, he was an MP in the National Council of Slovakia. He is a founding member of the Freedom and Solidarity party.

Early life
Droba was born in 1971 in Bratislava. In 1996 he graduated in English and Physical Education teaching at the Comenius University in Bratislava. After the graduation he enrolled in the Executive MBA programme at the Comenius University in Bratislava, which was organized in cooperation with the University of Pittsburgh.  While pursuing his MBA, Droba became a partner at a local communication firm called Omnipublic. In 2001 he went to the US to enroll at the Graduate School of Political Management of the George Washington University in Washington D.C. During his stay in the US, Droba befriended Eduard Heger, the future Prime Minister of Slovakia. After graduating from GWU, Droba returned to Slovakia and served as a Board Member and Director of External Communication division at Slovak Telekom. In 2007 he and Heger teamed up with a group of American investors to start Old Nassau, the producer of premium Slovak export vodka brand Double Cross Vodka.

Political career

Member of Parliament
Droba was elected to parliament in 2010 and again in 2012 on the liberal Freedom and Solidarity (SaS) party list. In 2013 he left the party with four other MPs due to disagreement with the leadership of the party's chairman Richard Sulík. The defectors subsequently founded the liberal wing of the New Majority party led by the popular former Minister of Interior Affairs Daniel Lipšic. Droba ran for the MEP seat on the New Majority list in 2014 but was not elected. Soon after, Droba found himself at odds with conservative members on the New Majority and expressed the desire to rejoin SaS. Nonetheless, he was not allowed back by the party members, despite the personal support of party's chairman Sulík himself. In spite of the rejection, Droba and another MP Eugen Jurzyca, who had previously defected from the Slovak Democratic and Christian Union – Democratic Party, joined with the loyalist SaS MPs to reestablish the SaS parliamentary faction, which had been previously dissolved as the remaining number of MPs after the defection was too low to warrant a faction. Droba retained his MP seat after 2016 electios, in which he once again ran on the SaS list. Nonetheless, he did not finish his full term as MP. Following his election as the Governor of Bratislava region he gave up his seat in the parliament in early 2018.

Governor of Bratislava region

Droba has been elected Governor of the Bratislava region in 2017. Soon after the election, he gave up his MP seat. In 2019 he rejoined the SaS party. and ran on the party list in the 2020 Slovak parliamentary election. In spite of being elected, he did not take his seat, claiming he only ran to support the party.

Droba won praise for prudently moving fast to close the schools in the Bratislava region following the outbreak of the Covid-19 pandemic in March 2020. In 2021 he was criticized for disruption in the regional bus service following the change in the company operating the bus lines. Droba blamed the Arriva company who took over the lines for disruption and claimed he spared no effort to rectify the situation as soon as possible.

Personal life

Droba married TV executive Gabriela Drobová in 2001. The marriage resulted in no children and ended in divorce in 2007. In 2012, he had a son Juraj from a relationship with Katarína Lešková. In 2022, Droba got engaged to Lucia Piteková, the director of Slovak representation at the Dubai Expo.

References 

Living people
1971 births
Governors of Bratislava Region
Members of the National Council (Slovakia) 2010-2012
Members of the National Council (Slovakia) 2012-2016
Members of the National Council (Slovakia) 2016-2020
Freedom and Solidarity politicians
Comenius University alumni
People from Bratislava
Slovak emigrants to the United States